Heanor and Loscoe is a civil parish in the Amber Valley district of Derbyshire, England.  The parish contains ten listed buildings that are recorded in the National Heritage List for England.  Of these, one is listed at Grade II*, the middle of the three grades, and the others are at Grade II, the lowest grade. The parish contains the town of Heanor and the area of Loscoe to the north.  The listed buildings consist of houses, a church, a barn, a public house, a monument in a cemetery, a former town hall, a former bank, and a school.


Key

Buildings

References

Citations

Sources

 

Lists of listed buildings in Derbyshire